Bila is a village in Ternopil Raion, Ternopil Oblast of Western Ukraine.

History
The existence of the village became known from the second half of the 16th century, in a document of the Polish magnate Konstanty Wasyl Ostrogski, where the fields that at that time belonged to Tarnopol were registered. In 1884, Oleksander Barvinsky launched one of the main cultural centers in the area here. In 1912, the first Ternopil airfield was established in Bila, where some of the first flight demonstrations in present-day Ukraine were made. Until the creation of the current municipality in 2018, the town formed a rural council on its own.

Geography
Bila is located on the northern outskirts of the regional capital Ternopil, at the exit of the city from the P39 road leading to Brody. The village is separated from the capital by the Ternopil-Vantazhnyi railway station and the adjoining industrial estate.

Demographics
In 2007, 2,927 people lived in the village.

Languages
Native language as of the Ukrainian Census of 2001:

References 

Villages in Ternopil Raion